Ibrahima Kalil Guirassy (born 14 October 1998) is a French footballer who plays as a midfielder for Portuguese club Oliveirense.

Career statistics

Club

Notes

References

1998 births
Living people
French footballers
French expatriate footballers
Guinean footballers
Guinean expatriate footballers
Association football midfielders
Tercera División players
Campeonato de Portugal (league) players
Liga Portugal 2 players
Olympique de Marseille players
Elche CF players
C.F. União players
Varzim S.C. players
SC São João de Ver players
U.D. Oliveirense players
Expatriate footballers in Spain
French expatriate sportspeople in Spain
Guinean expatriate sportspeople in Spain
Expatriate footballers in Portugal
French expatriate sportspeople in Portugal
Guinean expatriate sportspeople in Portugal